The 33rd Film Independent Spirit Awards, honoring the best independent films of 2017, were presented by Film Independent on March 3, 2018. The nominations were announced on November 21, 2017 by actresses Lily Collins and Tessa Thompson. The ceremony was televised in the United States by IFC, taking place inside its usual tent setting on a beach in Santa Monica, California. Nick Kroll and John Mulaney returned to host the ceremony for the second time.

Winners and nominees

{| class=wikitable style="width=100%"
|-
!style="width=50%"| Best Feature
!style="width=50%"| Best Director
|-
| valign="top" |
Get Out
 Call Me by Your Name
 The Florida Project
 Lady Bird
 The Rider
| valign="top" |
Jordan Peele – Get Out
 Sean Baker – The Florida Project
 Jonas Carpignano – A Ciambra
 Luca Guadagnino – Call Me by Your Name
 Safdie brothers – Good Time
 Chloé Zhao – The Rider
|-
!style="width=50%"| Best Male Lead
!style="width=50%"| Best Female Lead
|-
| valign="top" |
Timothée Chalamet – Call Me by Your Name as Elio Perlman
 Harris Dickinson – Beach Rats as Frankie
 James Franco – The Disaster Artist as Tommy Wiseau
 Daniel Kaluuya – Get Out as Chris Washington
 Robert Pattinson – Good Time as Constantine "Connie" Nikas
| valign="top" |
Frances McDormand – Three Billboards Outside Ebbing, Missouri as Mildred Hayes
 Salma Hayek – Beatriz at Dinner as Beatriz
 Margot Robbie – I, Tonya as Tonya Harding
 Saoirse Ronan – Lady Bird as Christine "Lady Bird" McPherson
 Shinobu Terajima – Oh Lucy! as Setsuko Kawashima / Lucy
 Regina Williams – Life and Nothing More as Regina
|-
!style="width=50%"| Best Supporting Male
!style="width=50%"| Best Supporting Female
|-
| valign="top" |
Sam Rockwell – Three Billboards Outside Ebbing, Missouri as Jason Dixon
 Nnamdi Asomugha – Crown Heights as Carl "KC" King
 Armie Hammer – Call Me by Your Name as Oliver
 Barry Keoghan – The Killing of a Sacred Deer as Martin
 Benny Safdie – Good Time as Nick Nikas
| valign="top" |
Allison Janney – I, Tonya as LaVona Golden
 Holly Hunter – The Big Sick as Beth Gardner
 Laurie Metcalf – Lady Bird as Marion McPherson
 Lois Smith – Marjorie Prime as Marjorie Prime
 Taliah Lennice Webster – Good Time as Crystal
|-
!style="width=50%"| Best Screenplay
!style="width=50%"| Best First Screenplay
|-
| valign="top" |
Greta Gerwig – Lady Bird
 Azazel Jacobs – The Lovers
 Martin McDonagh – Three Billboards Outside Ebbing, Missouri
 Jordan Peele – Get Out
 Mike White – Beatriz at Dinner
| valign="top" |
Emily V. Gordon and Kumail Nanjiani – The Big Sick
 Kristopher Avedisian, Kyle Espeleta, and Jesse Wakeman – Donald Cried
 Ingrid Jungermann – Women Who Kill
 Kogonada – Columbus
 David Branson Smith and Matt Spicer – Ingrid Goes West
|-
!style="width=50%"| Best First Feature
!style="width=50%"| Best Documentary Feature
|-
| valign="top" |
Matt Spicer – Ingrid Goes West
 Atsuko Hirayanagi – Oh Lucy!
 Geremy Jasper – Patti Cake$
 Kogonada – Columbus
 Joshua Z Weinstein – Menashe
| valign="top" |
Faces Places
 The Departure
 Last Men in Aleppo
 Motherland
 Quest
|-
!style="width=50%"| Best Cinematography
!style="width=50%"| Best Editing
|-
| valign="top" |
Sayombhu Mukdeeprom – Call Me by Your Name
 Thimios Bakatakis – The Killing of a Sacred Deer
 Elisha Christian – Columbus
 Hélène Louvart – Beach Rats
 Joshua James Richards – The Rider
| valign="top" |
Tatiana S. Riegel – I, Tonya
 Ronald Bronstein and Benny Safdie – Good Time
 Walter Fasano – Call Me by Your Name
 Alex O'Flinn – The Rider
 Gregory Plotkin – Get Out
|-
! colspan="2" style="width=50%"| Best International Film
|-
| colspan="2" valign="top" |
A Fantastic Woman (Una mujer fantástica) BPM (Beats per Minute)
 I Am Not a Witch
 Lady Macbeth 
 Loveless (Nelyubov)
|}

Films with multiple nominations and awards

Special awards

John Cassavetes Award
 Life and Nothing More
 Dayveon
 A Ghost Story
 Most Beautiful Island
 The Transfiguration

Robert Altman Award
(The award is given to its film director, casting director, and ensemble cast)

 Mudbound – Dee Rees, Billy Hopkins, Ashley Ingram, Jonathan Banks, Mary J. Blige, Jason Clarke, Garrett Hedlund, Jason Mitchell, Rob Morgan and Carey Mulligan

Kiehl's Someone to Watch Award
Recognizes a talented filmmaker of singular vision who has not yet received appropriate recognition. The award includes a $25,000 unrestricted grant funded by Kiehl's.

 Justin Chon – Gook
 Amman Abbasi – Dayveon
 Kevin Phillips – Super Dark Times

The BONNIE Award
The inaugural award recognizes a mid-career female director with a body of work that demonstrates uniqueness of vision and a groundbreaking approach to filmmaking. The award includes a $50,000 unrestricted grant funded by American Airlines.

 Chloé Zhao
 So Yong Kim
 Lynn Shelton

Piaget Producers Award
Honors emerging producers who, despite highly limited resources, demonstrate the creativity, tenacity and vision required to produce quality, independent films. The award includes a $25,000 unrestricted grant funded by Piaget.

 Summer Shelton – Keep the Change
 Giulia Caruso and Ki Jin Kim – Columbus
 Ben LeClair – The Lovers

Truer than Fiction Award
Presented to an emerging director of non-fiction features who has not yet received significant recognition. The award includes a $25,000 unrestricted grant.

 'Jonathan Olshefski – Quest Shevaun Mizrahi – Distant Constellation Jeff Unay – The Cage Fighter''

See also
 90th Academy Awards
 75th Golden Globe Awards
 71st British Academy Film Awards
 38th Golden Raspberry Awards
 24th Screen Actors Guild Awards
 23rd Critics' Choice Awards

References

External links
 

2017
Independent Spirit Awards